Rho guanine nucleotide exchange factor (GEF) 3, also known as ARHGEF3, is a human gene.

Function 

Rho GTPases play a fundamental role in numerous cellular processes that are initiated by extracellular stimuli that work through G protein-coupled receptors. The encoded protein may form complex with G proteins and stimulate Rho-dependent signals. This protein is similar to the NET1A protein.

Interactions 

ARHGEF3 has been shown to interact with RHOA and RHOB.

References

External links

Further reading